Marketa Kochta (born 14 July 1975) is a former professional tennis player from Germany.

Early life and family
Kochta was born in Prague, then part of Czechoslovakia, but later emigrated to Munich, where her father Jiří was a noted ice hockey coach.

As a junior, she was coached by her father and in 1991 was a member of the German team that won the World Youth Cup (now Junior Fed Cup).

Her elder sister Renata also played on the WTA Tour.

Kochta is married to Czech former tennis player Jiří Vaněk

Professional career
As a 16-year old, Kochta made the third round of the 1992 Australian Open.

In 1993, she made the semifinals of the Mazda Classic, a WTA Tour tournament in San Diego.

Her 1994 season was the strongest of her career, culminating in a mid-year ranking of 45, which remained her highest. She was nominated for the WTA Most Impressive Newcomer Award. Highlights for the year included beating Tracy Austin and Katerina Maleeva to make the third round of the 1994 French Open as well as upsetting world No. 5, Gabriela Sabatini, at the Pan Pacific Open in Tokyo.

She made the third round of the 1997 Australian Open as a qualifier.

ITF finals

Singles (2–4)

Doubles (1–4)

References

External links
 
 

1975 births
Living people
German female tennis players
Czechoslovak emigrants to Germany
Tennis players from Prague